Regitze Siggaard (born 22 September 1967) is a Danish rower. In the 1990 World Rowing Championships, she won a gold medal in the women's lightweight double sculls event.

References

See also

1967 births
Danish female rowers
World Rowing Championships medalists for Denmark
Living people